The 2016 PRAFL season will be the 3rd season of the semi-pro Puerto Rico American Football League. Officially, it is the 3rd season of the league. Cataño is scheduled to host the 3rd Championship on June 12. The regular season will begin April 3 and end on May 22.

Standings

Note: GP = Games Played, W = Wins, L = Losses, T = Ties, PF = Points For, PA = Points Against, Pts = Points, F/R = Final Record Including Playoffs

''Teams in bold are in playoff positions.X – clinched playoff berth and plays first round. Y – clinched first/second place and first round bye to semi-finals

PRAFL playoffs

Playoff bracket

*-Team won in Overtime.

References

Puerto Rico American Football League seasons